Teodoro Mariani  (28 February 1882 – 2 August 1916) was an Italian rower.

Mariani was born in Como in 1882. He received his education at Caio Plinio Secondo in Como from which he graduated in 1900 with a major in accounting.

In 1892, he joined the ASDG Comense 1872. He competed in various disciplines but after some time, he focused on gymnastics. His focus then switched to rowing and he left his original club and joined Canottieri Lario, a local rowing club, instead. In 1908, he became Italian champion in Salò in single sculls. At the 1909 European Rowing Championships near Paris, he became European champion in single sculls. At the 1911 European Rowing Championships in his home town Como, he became European champion in double sculls teamed up with Giuseppe Sinigaglia who he had been friends with from his time at ASDG Comense 1872.

In 1915, Mariani enlisted for WWI. He was killed by shrapnel on 2 August 1916 fighting on Monte Zebio. The street Via Teodoro Mariani and the municipal gym Teodoro Mariani located in Via Nazario Sauro in Como are named for him.

Bibliography
Casarola, Maurizio Lo chiamavano Sina, Nordpress Edizioni, 2007.
Bazzi, Mario  Il gigante buono, Tipografia Commerciale Prini & C., Como.

References

1882 births
1916 deaths
Italian male rowers
Italian military personnel killed in World War I
Sportspeople from Como
European Rowing Championships medalists